The 1912–13 New Mexico Lobos men's basketball team represented the University of New Mexico during the 1912–13 NCAA college men's basketball season. The head coach was Ralph Hutchinson, coaching his third season with the Lobos.

Schedule

|-

References

New Mexico Lobos men's basketball seasons
New Mexico